Bjarke Gundlev (9 January 1931 – 28 November 2019) was a Danish footballer. He played in one match for the Denmark national football team in 1957.

References

External links
 

1931 births
2019 deaths
Danish men's footballers
Denmark international footballers
Place of birth missing
Association footballers not categorized by position